The former Fort Dodge Senior High School building, also known as North Junior High and Phillips Middle School, is a historic building located in Fort Dodge, Iowa, United States. The building was constructed in 1922 with additions completed in 1948 and 1979. When the current high school was built in 1958, this building became known as North Junior High School, housing grades 7, 8, and 9. The Fort Dodge Community School District's adoption of the middle school philosophy in 1984 changed the name of the building to Phillips Middle School. District-wide grade reconfiguration in 1990 changed Phillips to a building housing grades 7 and 8. It, along with Fair Oaks Middle School, was sold to Foutch Brothers. LLC, of Kansas City, Missouri the following year to be converted into apartments. The building was listed on the National Register of Historic Places in 2015.

References

School buildings completed in 1922
Fort Dodge, Iowa
Defunct schools in Iowa
Buildings and structures in Webster County, Iowa
National Register of Historic Places in Webster County, Iowa
School buildings on the National Register of Historic Places in Iowa
1922 establishments in Iowa